The 1998–99 PGA Tour of Australasia was a series of men's professional golf events played mainly in Australia and New Zealand. The events were played during the calendar years of 1998 and 1999.

Schedule
The following table lists official events during the 1998–99 season.

Order of Merit
The Order of Merit was based on prize money won during the season, calculated in Australian dollars.

Awards

Source:

Notes

References

External links

PGA Tour of Australasia
Australasia
Australasia
PGA Tour of Australasia
PGA Tour of Australasia
PGA Tour of Australasia
PGA Tour of Australasia